Jefferis Ford is a river-crossing of the Brandywine located in Chester County, Pennsylvania which was significant in the American Revolutionary War.  In the march of British troops leading up to the Battle of the Brandywine General William Howe crossed here as well as at Trimble's Ford in a surprise maneuver in an attack on George Washington's troops to the south.

The ford is named for Robert Jefferis (1668–1739) who moved to the region around 1701.  He had emigrated from England to Chester County around 1681.

References

External links
Old sketch of Jefferis Ford

Transportation in Pennsylvania
Geography of Chester County, Pennsylvania
History of Chester County, Pennsylvania
Transportation in Chester County, Pennsylvania